Richard H. Katz (born 1942) is an American bridge player from Rancho Mirage, California. He is also a physician and a graduate of the University of Wisconsin–Madison.

Katz and Cohen

Katz and Larry T. Cohen won the collegiate bridge championship, then a  event, representing Wisconsin. They continued their partnership and won several major  events together during the next decade. Playing under ACBL auspices in Houston during January 1977, they were on the verge of advancing to represent North American in the Bermuda Bowl when officials accused them of cheating. They quit the final match after 96 of 128 s (which forced their three teammates to forfeit) and soon withdrew from the league, but subsequently sued the American Contract Bridge League for $44 million. 
The case was settled out of court with Katz and Cohen agreeing not to play with each other for the next two years.

Bridge accomplishments

Wins

 North American Bridge Championships (11)
 von Zedtwitz Life Master Pairs (1) 1989 
 Blue Ribbon Pairs (1) 1968 
 Nail Life Master Open Pairs (1) 1994 
 Grand National Teams (1) 1974 
 Vanderbilt (2) 1975, 1976 
 Mitchell Board-a-Match Teams (1) 1992 
 Chicago Mixed Board-a-Match (1) 1976 
 Reisinger (1) 1973 
 Spingold (2) 1973, 1976

Runners-up

 North American Bridge Championships
 Lebhar IMP Pairs (1) 1987 
 Blue Ribbon Pairs (1) 1969 
 Vanderbilt (1) 1973

References

1942 births
American contract bridge players
Physicians from California
People from Rancho Mirage, California
University of Wisconsin–Madison alumni
Living people
Place of birth missing (living people)
Date of birth missing (living people)